Patriarch Matthew may refer to:

 Patriarch Matthew I of Constantinople, Ecumenical Patriarch of Constantinople in 1397–1410, with a brief interruption in 1402–03
 Pope Matthew I of Alexandria (r. 1378–1408)
Pope Matthew II of Alexandria (r. 1453–1466)
 Patriarch Matthew II of Constantinople (r. three times, shortly in 1596, from 1598 to 1602 and for a few days in 1603)
 Pope Matthew III of Alexandria (r. 1631–1646)
 Pope Matthew IV of Alexandria (r. 1660–1675)
 Patriarch Matthew of Alexandria, Greek Orthodox Patriarch of Alexandria in 1746–1766
 Matthew I of Armenia (r. 1858–1865), Patriarch and Catholicos of All Armenians
 Matthew II of Armenia (r. 1908–1910), Patriarch and Catholicos of All Armenians